The 2008 Harlequins Rugby League season was the twenty-ninth in the club's history and their thirteenth season in the Super League. The club was coached by Brian McDermott, competing in Super League XIII, finishing in 9th place and reaching the Fifth round of the 2008 Challenge Cup.

2008 Squad

2008 Signings & transfers

2008 Gains & losses

Super League XIII table

2008 Fixtures/Results
2008 Engage Super League

 Notes
 (a) Round 13 played at Millennium Stadium, Cardiff.
 (b) engage Super League Grand Final to be played at Old Trafford, Manchester.

References

External links
London Broncos - Rugby League Project

London Broncos seasons
Harlequins Rugby League season
Harlequins Rugby League season